Murraycladius is a genus of midges in the family Chironomidae. There is one at least described species in Murraycladius, M. patwallacei.

References

Further reading

 
 

Tachinidae
Articles created by Qbugbot